Bois-Franc is a municipality in the La Vallée-de-la-Gatineau Regional County Municipality, Quebec, Canada,  north of Maniwaki. Its territory is along the western shores of the upper Gatineau River.

The adjective franc has its origin in the western regions of France and means "excellent, good, strong, solid, hard." Therefore the name Bois-Franc can be translated as "hardwood" and is a reference to magnificent stands of hardwoods found within the municipality, including beech, ash, maple and birch.

History
Its first European settlers came in 1870. Its post office, named Bois-Franc, opened in 1886. In 1920, the Municipality of Bois-Franc was founded when it separated from the Egan Municipality Township.

Demographics

Private dwellings occupied by usual residents (2021): 192 (out of 215 total)

Languages:
 French as first language: 96%
 English as first language: 2%
 Other as first language: 2%

Economy

Its primary industry is logging and forestry. Industrial Park "Réjean Lafrenière" is home to the oriented strand board factory Louisiana-Pacific Canada ltd. Division Quebec; one of the largest plants of its kind in North America.

Local government
List of former mayors:
 Joseph Brosseau (1921–1923)
 Léon Lyrette (1923–1929)
 Arthur Branchaud (1929–1954)
 Jean-Claude Branchaud (1954–1977)
 Gabriel Pilon (1977–1987)
 Marcel Hubert (1987–1991)
 Neil Brennan (1991–1997)
 Joël Branchaud (1997–2003)
 Armand Hubert (2003–2013)
 Julie Jolivette (2013–present)

References

External links 

 Official website

Incorporated places in Outaouais
Municipalities in Quebec